Churchill Airport  is located  east southeast of Churchill, Manitoba, Canada. The airport serves the town of Churchill and the surrounding region. Although it is a small domestic airport, it handles a relatively high number of passengers throughout the year as Churchill is a major destination for ecotourism and scientific research. Churchill Airport also serves as a transfer airport for passengers and cargo travelling between Winnipeg and remote communities in the Kivalliq Region of Nunavut.

History 
The airport was originally part of the Fort Churchill military installation built by the United States Army Air Forces, with the permission of the Canadian government, during the Second World War. Facilities at Fort Churchill supported the Canadian and American operations of the nearby Churchill Rocket Research Range beginning in the 1950s. The airport at Fort Churchill later served as a Strategic Air Command base housing the 3949th Air Base Squadron of the 813th Strategic Aerospace Division. The  asphalt runway is still maintained and the airport serves as a diversion airport for jet aircraft up to the size of a Boeing 747 or Boeing 777 that are forced to make emergency landings.

Airlines and destinations

See also

Churchill Water Aerodrome
Port of Churchill
Churchill station (Manitoba)

References

External links
COPA Page about this airport on COPA's Places to Fly airport directory

Buildings and structures in Churchill, Manitoba
1940s establishments in Manitoba
Airfields of the United States Army Air Forces in Canada
Airfields of the United States Army Air Forces Air Transport Command in North America
Certified airports in Manitoba
Installations of Strategic Air Command